Baykalsko or Baikalsko is a village in Radomir Municipality, Pernik Province, Southwest Bulgaria. Population: 75 (as of January 1, 2007).  It is named after Lake Baikal, Russia.

Until 13 July 1951, Baykalsko was named Chokl'ovo.

Honours
Baykal Point on Brabant Island, Antarctica is named after the village.

References

Villages in Pernik Province